CIJ is the acronym for Compagnie Industrielle du Jouet (or "Manufacturing Company of Toys"). It was a classic French brand of diecast metal toy vehicles. It was founded by Fernand Migault in Paris in 1920. The company name originally was Migault S.A. at the time that Migault's cousin Marcel Gourdet joined the firm.

History
On the grounds of contracts signed by André Citroën himself in 1922, the company produced exclusive model cars made of either metalware or wood in 1:20, la 5 CV Trèfle and la B14 Citroën included.  Solely authorised Citroën dealers distributed these model cars.  Still the company wasn't allowed to advertise their cooperation with  Citroën.

The metals workshop in Briare that Marcel Gourdet had brought to Ferdinand Migault's company burned down in 1929. At that time, the Bapterosses family provided capital to rebuild the company. The company moved its headquarters back to Paris, eventually employing more than a hundred people, mostly in the Briare factory.

The exclusive fabrication of model cars for Citroën ended in 1934 when Citroën went into administration and was eventually taken over by Michelin.
Many years later CIJ signed a less binding contract with Louis Renault concerning numerous types of Renault model cars in scales from 1:10 to 1:43, partly made of lithographed metal ware or in particular of  zamak. But this time CIJ was on its own in regards to the distribution.
An agreement with  Shell  about miniatures of filling stations including the transporter Shell Berre was signed in 1950. This model car was made of an alloy called ramec (which blended aluminium, copper, zinc and magnesium).
On 27 December 1964 new works were inaugurated in Briare. But one year later, after the company had bought the stash of its former competitor JRD, the company CIJ actually disappeared. The  Bapterosses family kept on producing exclusive series' of artisan type models in the Rivotte farm (in the vicinity of the  factory) but the works in Briare were engrossed by  ITT and produced henceforth parts for telephones.

The model cars 
The first model cars were completely made from iron sheet or wood (scale from 1:6 to 1:43) and because of the high quality CIJ could compete with other contemporary producer such as Dinky Toys and Norev.
In April 2007  Norev bought the brand  CIJ and announced 13 model cars made from zamac and two lithographed models from iron sheet (4CV Renault and Juvaquatre), which were new editions of the original CIJ model cars. Still these CIJ models were reintroduced as a brand under the Norev umbrella around 2005.

Bibliography

References

External links
Details on production
Article on JRD

Manufacturing companies established in 1920
Toy cars and trucks
Model manufacturers of France
Defunct manufacturing companies of France
Die-cast toys
French brands
Manufacturing companies disestablished in 1965
1920 establishments in France
1965 disestablishments in France